Kleanthis Vikelides (23 October 1916 – 4 November 1988) was a Greek footballer who played for Aris Thessaloniki and the Greece national football team. He was also a manager, taking charge of Aris Thessaloniki, PAOK and Apollon Kalamaria.

Vikelides was born in 1916 in Thessaloniki and was the youngest of the three Vikelides brothers that played for Aris F.C., the others being Kostas and Nikiforos. He was instrumental in Aris winning the Greek Championship in 1932 and 1946, given the nickname 'Macedonian Tank'. During his career, Vikelides was capped 7 times by the Greece National Football Team, scoring 4 goals. Vikelidis coached Aris Thessaloniki twice in 1954 and 1959 and later continued his managing career with PAOK during the 1957 season and Apollon Kalamaria during the 1961 season. In his honour, Aris FC named the stadium at Charilaou, Thessaloniki Kleanthis Vikelidis Stadium.

International goals

Sources

Αθλητική Ηχώ
Αθλητικός Σύλλογος Άρης 1914-2004 Κέντρο ιστορίας Θεσσαλονίκης, Θεσσαλονίκη 2004, 
Άρης 1914-2002, Άγγελος Καριπίδης
Κωνσταντίνος Ίντος, "Η Ιστορία του Άρη", τόμος 1, "Ποδόσφαιρο (1914–2000), Ο κίτρινος θεός του πολέμου στον 20ό αιώνα."

References

1916 births
1988 deaths
Footballers from Thessaloniki
Greek Macedonians
Aris Thessaloniki F.C. players
Super League Greece players
Greek footballers
PAOK FC managers
Niki Volos F.C. managers
Greece international footballers
Aris Thessaloniki F.C. managers
Association football forwards
Greek football managers